The 1938 Cal Aggies football team represented the College of Agriculture at Davis—now known as the University of California, Davis—as a member of the Far Western Conference (FWC) during the 1938 college football season. Led by second-year head coach Vern Hickey, the Aggies compiled an overall record of 2–6–1 with a mark of 0–2–1 in conference play, tying for fourth place in the FWC. The team was outscored by its opponents 174 to 58 for the season. The Cal Aggies played home games at A Street field on campus in Davis, California.

Schedule

Notes

References

Cal Aggies
UC Davis Aggies football seasons
Cal Aggies football